Liberty Hill, Tennessee may refer to the following places in the U.S. state of Tennessee:

Liberty Hill, Cocke County, Tennessee, an unincorporated community
Liberty Hill, Fayette County, Tennessee, an unincorporated community
Liberty Hill, Giles County, Tennessee, an unincorporated community
Liberty Hill, Grainger County, Tennessee, an unincorporated community
Liberty Hill, Greene County, Tennessee, an unincorporated community
Liberty Hill, McMinn County, Tennessee, an unincorporated community
Liberty Hill, Rhea County, Tennessee, an unincorporated community
Liberty Hill, Williamson County, Tennessee, an unincorporated community
Liberty Hill, Wilson County, Tennessee, an unincorporated community